The Museum of History and Ethnography of the Greeks of the Azov Sea Region is a branch of the Mariupol Museum of Local Lore located in the village of Sartana near Mariupol, Ukraine.

History 

In 1992, the museum became a branch of the Mariupol Museum of Local Lore.

In 1997, the museum received its modern name Museum of History and Ethnography of the Greeks of the Azov Sea Region.

Exposition 
More than 3,000 exhibits are presented in the museum on two floors in six halls. Its exposition reflects the process of resettlement of Greeks from the Crimean Khanate to the Azov Sea in second half of the 18th century, the establishment of Greek settlements, local territories and economic activity (agriculture, livestock, trade, crafts). It illustrates the preservation of cultural traditions, housing, clothing, jewelry, rituals and holidays, and the development of the Greek diaspora in the Azov region.

The exhibition History of the Greeks of the Azov Sea explains events that took place in Ukraine and Mariupol. It includes the October Revolution and the civil war in the region, the coming to power of the Soviets, the famine of the 1920s and 1930s and political repression. Also presented are events that end the Soviet era and illustrate the emergence of Ukraine on the political map, as well as the achievements of the Azov region today.

Collections of decorative and applied art are also on display, and attention is paid to the cuisine of the Azov Greeks.

Cultural activities supplement the visual displays, including the staging of a local wedding ceremony, a master class introducing traditional Greek costumes, cooking of national cuisine, events of ethnic music and theatrical performances.

The museum takes part in representations at local exhibitions, for example:
 History of the Greeks of the Azov region. 1999, Donetsk, celebrating the 220th anniversary of the migration of Greeks from the Crimea.
 Hellenes of the Azov region: Yesterday, today, tomorrow
 Modern wedding ceremony of the Greeks

In 1998, the museum participated in the international conference Ukraine-Greece - Prospects for development and cooperation.

The museum conducts walking tours of the village of Sartana for tourists.

Gallery

See also 

 Mariupol Museum of Local Lore
 The Azov Greek Museum description and photos

References 

History museums in Ukraine
Museums in Mariupol
Culture in Mariupol
Museums in Donetsk Oblast
Ethnographic museums in Ukraine
Greek diaspora in Ukraine